The 22997/22998 Jhalawar City–Shri Ganganagar Superfast Express is a superfast train belonging to West Central Railway zone of Indian Railways that run between  and  of Rajasthan state in India.

Coach composition

The train has standard LHB rakes with max speed of 110 kmph. The train consists of 19 coaches:

 1 AC II Tier
 4 AC III Tier
 8 Sleeper coaches
 4 General Unreserved
 2 End-on Generator

Service

22997/ Jhalawar City–Shri Ganganagar Superfast Express has an average speed of 55 km/hr and covers 1015 km in 18 hrs 30 mins.

The 22998/Shri Ganganagar–Jhalawar City Superfast Express has an average speed of 56 km/hr and covers 1015 km in 18 hrs 15 mins.

Route & Halts 

The important halts of the train are:

Schedule

Traction

It is hauled by a Tughlakabad-based WAP-7 locomotive from JLWC to SWM and handing over to a Bhagat Ki Kothi-based WDP-4 locomotive from SWM to SGNR & vice versa.

Direction reversal

Train reverses its direction at:

Rake sharing

The train shares its rake with 22981/22982 Kota–Shri Ganganagar Superfast Express.

External links
 22997/Jhalawar City–Shri Ganganagar Superfast Express India Rail Info
 22998/Shri Ganganagar–Jhalawar City Superfast Express India Rail Info

References

Express trains in India
Rail transport in Rajasthan
Transport in Sri Ganganagar
Railway services introduced in 2019